The  ("national gallery of modern and contemporary art"), also known as La Galleria Nazionale, is an art gallery in Rome, Italy. It was founded in 1883 on the initiative of the then Minister Guido Baccelli and is dedicated to modern and contemporary art.

History 

The present building, the Palazzo delle Belle Arti (Palace of Fine Arts) at Via delle Belle Arti, 113 (near the Etruscan Museum) was designed by prominent Italian architect Cesare Bazzani.  It was completed between 1911 and 1915.  The facade features exterior architectural friezes by sculptors Ermenegildo Luppi, Adolfo Laurenti, and Giovanni Prini, with four figures of Fame holding bronze wreaths, sculpted by Adolfo Pantaresi and Albino Candoni.

The museum was expanded and doubled in size by Bazzani in 1934. A new building by Luigi Cosenza was inaugurated in 1988 but closed ten years later due to safety concerns. A project developed by architects Diener & Diener between 1999 and 2000 was put on hold in year 2003. Works are currently in progress to make the Cosenza building usable again.

The museum 

The museum displays about 1100 paintings and sculptures of the nineteenth and twentieth centuries, of which it has the largest collection in Italy. Among the Italian artists represented are Giacomo Balla, Umberto Boccioni, Alberto Burri, Antonio Canova, Giorgio de Chirico, Lucio Fontana, Amedeo Modigliani, Giacomo Manzù, Vittorio Matteo Corcos, and Giorgio Morandi.

The museum also holds some works by foreign artists, among them Braque, Calder, Cézanne, Degas, Duchamp, Giacometti, Kandinsky, Mondrian, Monet, Jackson Pollock, Rodin, and Van Gogh.

The Museo Boncompagni Ludovisi per le arti decorative, the Museo Hendrik C. Andersen, the Raccoltà Manzù, and the Museo Mario Praz form part of the Galleria Nazionale.

It is sometimes referred to as "the teeth" by reason of its columnated appearance.

See also
 List of national galleries

References

External links
 Official website
 
 

Art museums and galleries in Rome
National museums of Italy
Renaissance Revival architecture in Italy
Modern art museums in Italy
Art museums established in 1883
1883 establishments in Italy
Rome Q. III Pinciano